Harpalodiodes xanthorhaphus is a species of beetle in the family Carabidae, the only species in the genus Harpalodiodes.

References

Harpalinae